Brentford Football Club is an English professional football club based in Brentford, London. Between 1897 and 1920, the first team competed in the London League, Southern League and Western League. Since 1920, the first team has competed in the Football League, the Premier League and other nationally and internationally organised competitions. All players who have been inducted into the club's Hall of Fame are listed below.

The Brentford Hall of Fame was founded in 1991 and the inaugural inductions were former players Idris Hopkins, Joe James and former player and manager Malky MacDonald. Former player Gary Roberts was the most recent inductee in February 2020 and the total number of members is 59. The Hall of Fame is administered jointly by the club and the Brentford F.C. Former Players’ Association.

Key
Appearance and goal totals include matches in the Football League, Southern League, FA Cup, League Cup, Football League Trophy, Anglo-Italian Cup, London Challenge Cup, Southern Floodlit Challenge Cup, Football League Jubilee Fund and Empire Exhibition Cup. Substitute appearances are included. Wartime matches are regarded as unofficial and are excluded.
 "Playing years" corresponds to the years in which the player made their first and last appearances.
 "Staff years" corresponds to the years in which the player began and finished their staff role.
 Players listed in bold won full international caps whilst with the club.
 Statistics are correct as of match played 3 November 2020.

Playing positions

List of members

Notes

References

Brentford
Hall Of Fame
 Hall Of Fame
Hall Of Fame
Brentford
Brentford
Brentford
Association football player non-biographical articles